Lee Huei Min (also known as Min Lee; born ) is a Singaporean classical violinist. She has been dubbed as "Singapore's poster girl of classical music".

Career
Lee started playing violin at the age of two, and gave her first public performance at five at the Victoria Concert Hall.  She went to the United States at the age of nine to study music at the University of Michigan and later at Oberlin College's Conservatory of Music. At the age of 14, Min she was accepted to the Masters program at Yale University. She was tutored by the late, eminent violinist Erick Friedman. Erick himself was a protégé of Jascha Heifetz and Nathan Milstein.

Lee has performed with renowned orchestras including Prague Chamber Orchestra, Singapore Symphony Orchestra, Royal Philharmonic Orchestra, Vienna Chamber Orchestra, Academy of St Martin in the Fields, Tchaikovsky Symphony Orchestra and Russian National Orchestra.

She recorded an album Debut with the Royal Philharmonic Orchestra.

She was given the Singapore Youth Award in 2004.

In April 2011 she became brand ambassador for Finnair in Singapore.

She is the Program Director of the Wolfgang Violin Studio.

Personal life
She has three sisters Lee Huei Tjin, Lee Huey Yuan and Lee Huei Sheen. She is married to Loh Lik Peng and has a son Conor Loh and a daughter Cassie Loh.

References

External links
 Min Lee - Official homepage
 Wolfgang Violin Studio - About Us

1980s births
Living people
Singaporean people of Chinese descent
Singaporean classical violinists
University of Michigan alumni
Yale School of Music alumni
Oberlin College alumni
21st-century classical violinists
Women classical violinists